Al-Rawnah is a sub-district located in Bani Hushaysh District, Sana'a Governorate, Yemen. Al-Rawnah had a population of 4596 according to the 2004 census.

References 

Sub-districts in Bani Hushaysh District